"Boy Next Door" is a song by British R&B singer Jamelia. It was released as the fourth and final single from her debut album Drama. The song is one of two of Jamelia's singles to miss the UK Top 40, peaking at No. 42 and spending only two weeks inside the Top 75. The version released as a single was a slight remix to the version that appears on the album and is also slightly shorter in length.

Track listing
UK CD 1
 "Boy Next Door" (Radio Edit)
 "Money" (Smokin Beats Club Mix Edit)
 "Boy Next Door" (Raw Soul Mix)
 "Boy Next Door" (Enhanced section – video & photos)

UK CD 2
 "Boy Next Door" (Radio Edit)
 "Boy Next Door" (Stush Mix)
 "Boy Next Door" (Code Blue Mix)

Charts

References

2000 singles
Jamelia songs
Songs written by Jamelia
2000 songs
Parlophone singles